The Stratford Osceolas were an American professional baseball team located in Stratford, Connecticut. They were founded on June 18, 1866, by Bruce Allardice. They were the champions of the state of Connecticut in 1871.

Notable players 

 Jim O'Rourke
 Frank Buttery
 Tim Murnane

References

External links
 https://web.archive.org/web/20210525154031/https://ourgame.mlblogs.com/tim-murnane-heart-of-the-game-a6c5f63a0063?gi=4a9883bb82

Baseball teams established in 1866
Defunct baseball teams in Connecticut
Sports clubs disestablished in the 1870s
Stratford, Connecticut